Dirk Gently's Holistic Detective Agency is a BBC America comic science fiction detective television series created and primarily written by Max Landis. The two seasons are inspired by the novel series of the same name by Douglas Adams. The series is co-produced and distributed by BBC America and Netflix, along with AMC Studios, Ideate Media and IDW Entertainment. Filming primarily took place in Vancouver, British Columbia.

The series features an ensemble cast, including Samuel Barnett as the "holistic detective" Dirk Gently, and Elijah Wood as his reluctant sidekick Todd. Other main cast members include Hannah Marks as Todd's sister Amanda, Jade Eshete as security officer Farah Black, Fiona Dourif as "holistic assassin" Bart, and Mpho Koaho as computer technician Ken. The first season is set in Seattle, Washington and the second season is set in the fictional town of Bergsberg, Montana.

The eight-episode first season premiered on BBC America on October 22, 2016, to positive reviews, before concluding on December 10, 2016. All episodes were made available on Netflix (outside of the United States) on December 11, 2016. On November 21, 2016, BBC America renewed the series for a 10-episode second season which premiered on 14 October 2017. Following the broadcast of the second-season finale, the show was cancelled.

Premise
The show is based around the eccentric Dirk Gently (Samuel Barnett) who claims to be a "holistic detective", investigating obscure cases based on the inter-connectivity of all things. During the first season he befriends Todd Brotzman (Elijah Wood) and Farah Black (Jade Eshete) who help him with his cases. Dirk's past is linked with "Project Blackwing", a secret CIA project to evaluate subjects with strange abilities. Dirk is not only followed by agents of Blackwing trying to recapture him but also by Bart Curlish (Fiona Dourif), another Blackwing subject who considers herself a "holistic assassin" and believes she is destined to kill Dirk.

Cast
 Samuel Barnett as Dirk Gently, an eccentric "holistic" detective, who understands everything in the universe to be interconnected. He does not solve cases by conventional means, but rather by following fate. It is revealed that he was part of a government organization studying people with 'special' abilities, as he is mildly psychic. He carries himself as excitable and optimistic, as a mask over his own loneliness and insecurity.
 Elijah Wood as Todd Brotzman, Dirk's reluctant sidekick/assistant. A bellhop who spends all of his money to help his sister Amanda afford her treatment for pararibulitis, a fictional disease he claims to have been cured of. It is later revealed he lied about ever having it; moreover he has lied to and stolen from everyone he has ever cared about. He now attempts to atone for his many crimes by taking care of his sister. At the end of season 1, he becomes afflicted by pararibulitis.
 Hannah Marks as Amanda Brotzman, Todd's sister who suffers from pararibulitis, a  hereditary disease invented for the show that causes vivid and painful hallucinations. Amanda later joins the Rowdy 3, who help her manage her hallucinations.
 Jade Eshete as Farah Black, an efficient and tough security officer with obsessive-compulsive disorder. After her millionaire boss is killed and his daughter kidnapped, Farah is determined to solve the case alongside Dirk and Todd. She makes every attempt to keep the group safe, even when unsure she is capable of doing so.
 Fiona Dourif as Bart Curlish, a "holistic" assassin who believes that the universe leads her to people she has to kill, and that it won't allow her to die. She feels that she must hunt "Dirk Gently", despite not knowing who or what he is. She and Dirk are mirrors of each other, often paralleling one another from scene to scene. Because of her tendency to directly or indirectly murder people around her, Bart is extremely unsocialized, and has a jaded view of death.
 Mpho Koaho as Ken Adams, an electronics expert whom Bart kidnaps and forces to travel with her. While most of his recent work has been criminal in nature, he admits it is just due to his desperation for a paycheck, and is afraid of any excitement. Over the course of season 1, he befriends Bart, eventually coming to believe in the supernatural. In season 2, he is kidnapped by Blackwing, only to later become a supervisor.

Rowdy 3 
The Rowdy 3 is a hedonist group first introduced as a group of four. (In season 2, it is revealed that they were initially three.) At the end of season 1, Amanda joins their ranks, making them five. The Rowdy 3 are among the people studied by the government organization tracking Dirk. They were originally classified as vampires because they survive by consuming people's emotional energy. At the end of season 2, the Rowdy 3 gain yet another member, The Beast. 

 Michael Eklund as Martin, leader of the Rowdy 3. 
Osric Chau as Vogel (season 2; recurring season 1), the youngest member of the Rowdy 3.
Viv Leacock as Gripps, a member of the Rowdy 3.
Zak Santiago as Cross, a member of the Rowdy 3.

Law enforcement 
 Dustin Milligan as Sgt. Hugo Friedkin, a dimwitted government agent tracking Dirk.

Recurring

Introduced in Season 1

Law enforcement
Neil Brown Jr. as Det. Estevez, a missing persons detective, and Zimmerfield's partner.
Richard Schiff as Det. Zimmerfield, a missing persons detective, and Estevez's partner.
Miguel Sandoval as Col. Scott Riggins, a government agent and Sgt. Friedkin's commanding officer.
David Lewis as Agent Weedle, an FBI agent at odds with detectives Estevez and Zimmerfield.
Fiona Vroom as Jessica Wilson, government overseer of the Blackwing project.

Men of the Machine 
Aaron Douglas as Gordon Rimmer, the main antagonist of Season 1; a desperate man obsessed with gaining power, prolonging his life, and retrieving his dog.
Michael Adamthwaite as Zed, a key member of the Men of the Machine.
Christian Bako as Ed, a key member of the Men of the Machine. 
Mackenzie Gray as Lux Dujour, a disappeared rock star.

Spring family
Alison Thornton as Lydia Spring, a missing heiress, daughter of the murdered Patrick Spring.
Julian McMahon as Patrick Spring / Edgar Spring / Zackariah Webb, a murdered millionaire and father of Lydia Spring. He is revealed to be an inventor, originally from the 1800s, who had accidentally discovered time travel through his experiments with electricity.

Introduced in Season 2

Bergsberg, Montana law enforcement
Tyler Labine as Sherlock Hobbs, an under-stimulated, but overly enthusiastic small town sheriff who is eager to help Dirk and crew solve a new mystery.
Izzie Steele as Tina Tevetino, Hobbs' deputy, who is extremely laid back about life and the law and glad that Dirk and his friends' new mystery is bringing much-needed excitement to her currently-boring everyday life.

Law enforcement and Blackwing people
Alan Tudyk as Mr. Osmund Priest, a ruthless, dangerous, and violent bounty hunter working for Blackwing.
Alexia Fast as Mona Wilder, a.k.a. "Project Lamia", a shapeshifter and self-described "holistic actress". She is a Blackwing test subject and close friend of Dirk, whom she has accompanied since before the Spring case, having taken the form of his "Panic Pete" stress toy.

Boreton family
Amanda Walsh as Suzie Boreton, an unassuming, insecure, depressed mother. She later becomes a powerful witch and tries to conquer Wendimoor.
John Stewart as Bob Boreton, Suzie's workaday husband and a motel maintenance worker.
Jared Ager-Foster as Scott Boreton, Bob and Suzie's delinquent son.

Wendimoor people
Christopher Russell as Panto Trost, the eldest Trost son, who leaves Wendimoor in search of Dirk and forges an unlikely friendship with Bart.
Lee Majdoub as Silas Dengdamor, the eldest Dengdamor son and Panto's lover.
Ajay Friese as Farson Dengdamor, Silas' younger brother, whose disappearance has brewed conflict between the Trosts and the Dengdamors.
Aleks Paunovic as Wygar Oak, an imposing warrior and enforcer for the Dengdamor family.
Emily Tennant as The Beast, a rainbow-haired creature from Wendimoor who becomes infatuated with Dirk. She later joins Amanda and the Rowdy 3.
John Hannah as The Mage, the main antagonist of Season 2; a powerful wizard who takes great pleasure in his evildoings, seeking to conquer a world not his own.

Episodes

Season 1 (2016)

Season 2 (2017)

Reception
The first season received a favorable response from critics. On Rotten Tomatoes, it has a 71% approval rating based on 28 reviews, with an average rating of 6.54/10. The site's consensus reads "Odd and ambitious, Dirk Gently's Holistic Detective Agency sometimes overdoses on pure weirdness but offers absurdist rewards to those who stick with it." On Metacritic, the first season has a score of 62 out of 100 based on 14 reviews, indicating "generally favorable reviews".

The second season was also received favorably. On Rotten Tomatoes, it has a 100% approval rating based on 11 reviews, with an average rating of 7.33/10. However, its viewership was down from the first season, averaging fewer than 250,000 views per episode compared to 287,000 per episode from Season 1. It is believed these numbers, which were slightly lower than fellow BBC America program Orphan Black, led the choice for the network to cancel the show. Following the broadcast of the second-season finale, BBC America announced the show's cancellation. The decision to cancel the series sparked outrage among fans of the show, and a petition was started to renew the series. As of March 2018, the petition had received over 100,000 signatures.

References

External links
 
 

2010s American comic science fiction television series
2016 American television series debuts
2017 American television series endings
BBC America original programming
Dirk Gently
Douglas Adams
English-language Netflix original programming
American time travel television series
Works by Max Landis
Television shows based on British novels
Television shows filmed in Vancouver
Television shows set in Seattle
Television shows set in Montana